Fabian Rießle (also spelled Riessle, born 18 December 1990) is a German nordic combined skier.

Career
At the 2014 Winter Olympics in Sochi he won the bronze medal in the individual large hill/10 km competition. He became 9th in the ski jumping and started 56 seconds behind the leader, teammate Eric Frenzel. Rießle joined the leading group by mid-distance, and at the finish line became third. Six days earlier, in the individual normal hill/10 km event he finished 8th. On 20 March 2014, Rießle together with Björn Kircheisen, Johannes Rydzek, and Eric Frenzel won the silver medal in the team event.

At the 2018 Winter Olympics in Pyeongchang he won the silver medal in the individual large hill/10 km competition. On 22 February 2018, Rießle together with Vinzenz Geiger, Eric Frenzel, and Johannes Rydzek won the gold medal in the team event.

Record

Olympic Games

World Championship

World Cup

Standings

Individual victories

References

External links

German male Nordic combined skiers
Olympic Nordic combined skiers of Germany
Nordic combined skiers at the 2014 Winter Olympics
Nordic combined skiers at the 2018 Winter Olympics
Olympic gold medalists for Germany
Olympic silver medalists for Germany
Olympic bronze medalists for Germany
Medalists at the 2014 Winter Olympics
Medalists at the 2018 Winter Olympics
Olympic medalists in Nordic combined
Living people
1990 births
FIS Nordic World Ski Championships medalists in Nordic combined
Sportspeople from Freiburg im Breisgau